German submarine U-244 was a Type VIIC U-boat of Nazi Germany's Kriegsmarine during World War II. The submarine was laid down on 24 October 1942 at the Friedrich Krupp Germaniawerft yard at Kiel as yard number 678, launched on 2 September 1943 and commissioned on 9 September under the command of Oberleutnant zur See Ruprecht Fischer.

In four patrols, she sank no ships.

She surrendered to the Allies on 14 May 1945.

Design
German Type VIIC submarines were preceded by the shorter Type VIIB submarines. U-244 had a displacement of  when at the surface and  while submerged. She had two shafts and two  propellers.

U-244 was fitted with five  torpedo tubes (four fitted at the bow and one at the stern), fourteen torpedoes, one  SK C/35 naval gun, (220 rounds), one  Flak M42 and two twin  C/30 anti-aircraft guns. The boat had a complement of between forty-four and sixty.

Service history
After training with the 5th U-boat Flotilla at Kiel, U-244 was transferred to the 9th flotilla for front-line service on 1 August 1944. She was reassigned to the 11th flotilla on 1 November.

First patrol
The boat's first patrol was preceded by short trips between Kiel, Horten Naval Base in Norway and Bergen, also in Norway. It was while she was travelling between these latter two places that she was attacked by two Norwegian Mosquito aircraft of No. 333 Squadron RAF on 25 July 1944. One man was killed, seven others were wounded.

The patrol proper began with U-244s departure from Bergen on 9 August 1944. Her route took her south of Iceland. She returned to Bergen on 1 November.

Second and third patrols
More short voyages followed, between Bergen and Stavanger, but they were not listed as patrols. The boat's second sortie in December 1944, passed without incident.

Her third foray saw her reach as far as the English Channel, off Worthing. At 64 days, it was her longest patrol.

Fourth patrol
The submarine surrendered at Loch Eriboll in Scotland on 14 May 1945. Later that same day, she was being towed to scuttling grounds as part of Operation Deadlight when the tow parted; the boat was then sunk with gunfire from the Polish destroyer Piorun.

References

Bibliography

External links

World War II submarines of Germany
German Type VIIC submarines
U-boats commissioned in 1943
1943 ships
Ships built in Kiel
Operation Deadlight
U-boats sunk in 1945
U-boats sunk by Polish warships